Wisdom is a surname. Notable people with the surname include:

Andre Wisdom (born 1993), English footballer
Elsie Mary Wisdom (1904–1972), English racing driver
Jack Wisdom (born 1953), American professor of Planetary Sciences 
John Wisdom (1904–1993), British philosopher 
John Minor Wisdom (1905–1999), American judge
Norman Wisdom (1915–2010), British comedian
Olli Wisdom, British musician
Patrick Wisdom (born 1991), American baseball player
Robert Wisdom (born 1953), American actor
Robert Wisdom (New South Wales politician) (1830–1888),  Attorney General
Tom Wisdom (born 1973), English actor
Tommy Wisdom (1906–1972), English motoring corrspondent and racing driver

Fictional characters:
Peter Wisdom, secret agent published by Marvel Comics

See also
Wisdom